HMS St Michael was a 90-gun second rate ship of the line of the Royal Navy, built by John Tippetts of Portsmouth Dockyard and launched in 1669.

St Michael was rebuilt at Blackwall Yard in 1706, at which time she was also renamed HMS Marlborough. On 5 April 1725 Marlborough was ordered to be taken to pieces and rebuilt at Chatham. She was relaunched on 25 September 1732.

On 11 February 1744 during the Battle of Toulon. Marlborough and Namur bore the brunt of the Spanish fire, her captain James Cornewall, and 42 crew were killed and 120 wounded out of her crew of 750 men. Command passed to his distant cousin, Frederick Cornewall, the First Lieutenant, who was severely wounded and lost his right arm. Cornewall was buried at sea.

Marlborough was reduced to a 68-gun ship in 1752.

She formed part of Sir George Pocock's fleet at the taking of Havana from the Spanish in 1762. Whilst making her way back to Britain she was caught in very heavy weather, and on 29 November 1762 her crew were forced to abandon ship, all of her crew being taken off by a passing  before she sank. Her Captain Thomas Burnett was court martialled as a result, and although exonerated would not regain a command until 1770.

Notes

References
Lavery, Brian (2003) The Ship of the Line - Volume 1: The development of the battlefleet 1650-1850. Conway Maritime Press. .
Michael Phillips. Marlborough (96) (1706). Michael Phillips' Ships of the Old Navy. Retrieved 6 December 2007.

Ships of the line of the Royal Navy
1660s ships
Ships built in Portsmouth
Maritime incidents in 1762